The Cologne Grand Prix was a men's tennis tournament held in Cologne, West Germany, between 1976 and 1986. The tournament was a part of the Grand Prix tennis circuit for male tennis players and was played on indoor carpet courts.

Finals

Singles

Doubles

1981 doubles results not included on ATP website

See also 

 Cologne Open (1992)
 Bett1Hulks Indoors (2020)
 Bett1Hulks Championship (2020)

External links

Defunct tennis tournaments in Germany
Grand Prix tennis circuit
Recurring sporting events established in 1976
Recurring events disestablished in 1986
Sport in Cologne
1976 establishments in West Germany
1986 disestablishments in West Germany